Chutavuth Pattarakampol (born 21 March 1993), also known as March, is a Thai actor and host. He is well known for his role in Hormones: The Series.

Early life and education
Chutavuth was born on 21 March 1993 in Bangkok, Thailand.

He attended Saint Gabriel's College, Suankularb Wittayalai School and finished a bachelor's degree from Faculty of Commerce and Accountancy at Chulalongkorn University in 2015.

Personal life
He is passionate in playing football and swimming.

Filmography

Film

Television series

References

1993 births
Living people
Chutavuth Pattarakampol
Chutavuth Pattarakampol
Chutavuth Pattarakampol
Chutavuth Pattarakampol
Chutavuth Pattarakampol